Billie Honor Whitelaw  (6 June 1932 – 21 December 2014) was an English actress. She worked in close collaboration with Irish playwright Samuel Beckett for 25 years and was regarded as one of the foremost interpreters of his works. She was also known for her portrayal of Mrs. Baylock, the demonic nanny in the 1976 horror film The Omen.

Early life
Whitelaw was born in Coventry, Warwickshire, the daughter of Frances Mary (née Williams) and Gerry Whitelaw. She had one sister, Constance, who was 10 years older. Whitelaw grew up in a working class part of Bradford and later attended Grange Girls' Grammar School in Bradford.

At age 11, she began performing as a child actress on radio programmes, including the part of Bunkle, an extrovert prep-schoolboy on Children's Hour from Manchester, and later worked as an assistant stage manager and acted with the repertory company at the Prince's Theatre in Bradford during high school. Her father died of lung cancer when Billie was 9 years old. Money was tight, and her mother struggled to support the family. "It's something I haven't come to terms with ... I'm rather ashamed of having the good life I have", she later recalled.

At the age of sixteen, Whitelaw met the director Joan Littlewood at the BBC in Manchester, and was invited to join her Theatre Workshop troupe. She was encouraged by her mother to join Harry Hanson's Leeds company in 1948, and then went on to play in repertory theatres in Dewsbury, New Brighton in Liverpool, and Oxford, eventually making her London debut in 1950.

Film career

Whitelaw made her film debut in The Sleeping Tiger (1954), followed by roles in Carve Her Name with Pride (1958) and Hell Is a City (1960). Whitelaw soon became a regular in British films of the 1950s and early 1960s. In her early film work, she specialised in blousy blondes and secretaries, but her dramatic range began to emerge by the late 1960s. She starred with Albert Finney in Charlie Bubbles (1967), a performance which won her a BAFTA award as Best Actress in a Supporting Role. She would win her second BAFTA as the sensuous mother of college student Hayley Mills in the psychological study Twisted Nerve (1969). She continued in film roles including Leo the Last (1970), Start the Revolution Without Me (1970), Gumshoe (1971), and the Alfred Hitchcock thriller Frenzy (1972).

Whitelaw gained international acclaim for her chilling role as Mrs. Baylock, the evil guardian of the demon child Damien in The Omen (1976). Her performance was considered one of the more memorable of the film, winning her the Evening Standard British Film Award for Best Actress. Other films included performing the voice of Aughra in The Dark Crystal, as the hopelessly naive Mrs. Hall in Maurice (1987), one of two sisters, with Joan Plowright, struggling to survive in war-time Liverpool in The Dressmaker (1988), the fiercely domineering and protective mother of psychopathic twin murderers in The Krays (1990), a performance that earned her a BAFTA nomination, as the nurse Grace Poole in Jane Eyre (1996), and the blind laundress in Quills (2000). She returned to film, in a comedy turn, as Joyce Cooper in Hot Fuzz (2007).

In 1970, she was a member of the jury at the 20th Berlin International Film Festival.

Theatre and Beckett
In 1963, Billie Whitelaw met Irish playwright Samuel Beckett. She and Beckett enjoyed an intense professional relationship until his death in 1989. He wrote many of his more experimental plays especially for her, referring to Whitelaw as "a perfect actress". Whitelaw became Beckett's muse, as he created, reworked and revised each play while she physically, at times to the point of total exhaustion, acted each movement.

Whitelaw remained the foremost interpreter of the man and his work. She gave lectures on the Beckettian technique, and explained, "He used me as a piece of plaster he was moulding until he got just the right shape". They collaborated on Beckett plays such as Play, Eh Joe, Happy Days, Not I, Footfalls and Rockaby for both stage and screen. For her performance in Rockaby Whitelaw was nominated for a Drama Desk Award.

From 1964 to 1966, she was a member of Britain's National Theatre Company. In 1965, she took over the part of Desdemona opposite Laurence Olivier's Othello from Maggie Smith.

Television career
Whitelaw also appeared frequently on television and won acclaim for her work. A very early TV appearance was in the first series of the long-running BBC1 police series Dixon of Dock Green (1955), as Mary Dixon, daughter of George (Jack Warner). She also appeared as a woman who tries to join Robin Hood's outlaw band in a 1957 episode of The Adventures of Robin Hood, "The Bride of Robin Hood", and won a BAFTA award as Best Actress for her performance in The Sextet (1972). She starred on the 1958–59 sitcom Time Out for Peggy. She also appeared in an episode of Wicked Women (1970), the BBC adaptation of Thomas Hardy's Wessex Tales (1973), A Tale of Two Cities (1980), Private Schulz (1982), A Murder of Quality (1991), Duel of Hearts (1991), Firm Friends (1992–1994) with Madhur Jaffrey, Jane Eyre (1996), Born to Run (1997), Merlin (1998) and A Dinner of Herbs (2000).

Personal life and death
Whitelaw was married to the actor Peter Vaughan from 1952 to 1966 then to the writer and drama critic Robert Muller, with whom she had a son, until his death in 1998. Her autobiography Billie Whitelaw... Who He? was published by St. Martin's Press in 1996.

Having divided her time between a home in Hampstead, north London, and a cottage in Suffolk, Whitelaw spent the last four years of her life as a resident of Denville Hall, the actors’ retirement and nursing home in Northwood, Hillingdon. She died there following a bout of pneumonia on 21 December 2014, aged 82.

Honours

Whitelaw was appointed a Commander of the Order of the British Empire by Queen Elizabeth II in the 1991 Birthday Honours.

Selected filmography

 The Fake (1953) as Waitress
 The Sleeping Tiger (1954) as Receptionist at Pearce & Mann
 Companions in Crime (1955)
 Room in the House (1955)
 Mr. Arkadin (1955) (voice)
 Miracle in Soho (1957) as Maggie
 Small Hotel (1957) as Caroline Mallet
 Carve Her Name with Pride (1958) as Winnie
 Gideon's Day (1958) as Christine (uncredited)
 Time Out for Peggy (1958–1959, TV Series) as Peggy Spencer
 Breakout (1959) as Rose Munro
 Bobbikins (1959) as Lydia Simmons
 The Flesh and the Fiends (1960) as Mary Patterson
 Hell Is a City (1960) as Chloe Hawkins
 Make Mine Mink (1960) as Lily
 Payroll (1961) as Jackie Parker
 No Love for Johnnie (1961) as Mary
 Mr. Topaze (1961) as Ernestine
 The Devil's Agent (1962) as Piroska Maslov
 The Comedy Man (1964) as Judy
 Charlie Bubbles (1967) as Lottie Bubbles
 The Strange Case of Dr Jekyll and Mr. Hyde (1968, TV Movie) as Gwyn Thomas
 Twisted Nerve (1968) as Joan Harper
 The Adding Machine (1969) as Daisy Devore
 Start the Revolution Without Me (1970) as Queen Marie Antoinette
 Leo the Last (1970) as Margaret
 Gumshoe (1971) as Ellen
 Eagle in a Cage (1972) as Madame Bertrand
 Frenzy (1972) as Hetty Porter
 Follow the Yellow Brick Road (1972, TV Series) as Judy Black
 Night Watch (1973) as Sarah Cooke
 Napoleon and Love (1974, TV Mini-Series) as Josephine
 The Omen (1976) as Mrs Baylock
 Space: 1999 (1976, TV Series ) as Zamara
 The Water Babies (1978) as Mrs. Doasyouwouldbedoneby / Old Crone / Mrs Tripp / Woman in Black / Water Babies 'Gate Keeper'
 Leopard in the Snow (1978) as Isabel James
 A Tale of Two Cities (1980) as Madame Therese Defarge
 Private Schulz (1980) as Bertha Freyer
 An Unsuitable Job for a Woman (1982) as Elizabeth Leaming
 The Dark Crystal (1982) as Aughra (voice)
 Jamaica Inn (1983, TV Series) as Aunt Patience
 Terror in the Aisles (1984) as Madge
 The Chain (1984) as Mrs. Andreos
 Camille (1984, TV Movie) as Prudence Duvorney
 Tangiers (1985) as Louise
 Shadey (1985) as Doctor Cloud
 Murder Elite (1985) as Margaret Baker
 Maurice (1987) as Mrs Hall
 The Secret Garden (1987) as Mrs Medlock
 Joyriders (1988) as Tammy O'Moore
 The Dressmaker (1988) as Margo
 The Krays (1990) as Violet Kray
 Freddie as F.R.O.7 (1992) as Messina (voice)
 Deadly Advice (1994) as Kate Webster
 Jane Eyre (1996) as Grace Poole
 Merlin (1998, TV Mini-Series) as Ambrosia
 The Lost Son (1999) as Mrs Spitz
 The Last of the Blonde Bombshells (2000) as Evelyn
 Quills (2000) as Madame LeClerc
 Hot Fuzz (2007) as Joyce Cooper (final film role)

References

External links
Daily Telegraph obituary
 
Video of Billie Whitelaw performing Beckett's Not I

Billie Whitelaw; Aveleyman

1932 births
2014 deaths
Actresses from Coventry
Actresses from Warwickshire
Alumni of RADA
Best Supporting Actress BAFTA Award winners
Best Actress BAFTA Award (television) winners
Commanders of the Order of the British Empire
Deaths from pneumonia in England
English film actresses
English stage actresses
English television actresses
English voice actresses
20th-century British businesspeople